The 2005–06 Vermont Catamounts season was their first in Hockey East. Led by head coach Dennis Miller, the Catamounts had 3 victories, compared to 29 defeats and 2 ties. Their conference record was 1 victory, 19 defeats and 1 tie. On October 29 and 30, the Catamounts competed in the Nichols Tournament, held in Buffalo, New York.

Regular season

Schedule

Awards and honors
Gabe Worzella, National Strength and Conditioning All-American
Abbey Kaknes, Humanitarian Award Nominee 
Abbey Kaknes, Hockey East All-Star Team vs. Team USA

Team records
Team Single Season Record, Most Games Lost, (29), 2005–06
Team Single Season Record, Most Penalties, (172), 2005–06

References

Vermont Catamounts Women's Ice Hockey Season, 2005-06
Vermont Catamounts women's ice hockey seasons
Cata
Cata